Founded in 2001, Orchlon School in Ulaanbaatar, Mongolia, is a non-profit, private, co-educational day school offering an international secondary education curriculum from Nursery to Grade 12 students. It is a College preparatory school with around 70% of graduates enrolling in Universities and Colleges in the United States, United Kingdom, Australia, Singapore, and China.

In 2007, Orchlon School was named "The Best Secondary School of Mongolia" by the Mongolian Ministry of Education, Culture, Science and Technology, for Orchlon schools' education program, learning facilities, and teacher quality

Orchlon School is a bilingual school with an international secondary education curriculum. Orchlon school is one of a number of schools in Mongolia which offer the Cambridge International A level program. From its beginning Orchlon school has emphasized mathematics and sciences, with teaching carried out in both English and Mongolian. Orchlon school students have won awards from International Mathematics and Science Olympiads.

Orchlon school is the first school in Mongolia to offer Cambridge Secondary Qualifications in all levels. Orchlon School became the Cambridge International Centre in July 2008 and was the first to provide Mongolian students with same opportunities as students in 6000 schools in 150 countries around the world. Cambridge International Examinations has different programmes and qualifications specially designed for primary, middle, and high school students. Orchlon School started with the International General Certificate of Secondary Education (IGCSE) qualification awarded to 15- to 16-year-old students. In the 2010–2011 school year Orchlon started to offer the Cambridge "A" level programme.  From 2010 to 2011 school year Orchlon School was awarded membership of the Cambridge International Primary Programme by fulfilling all standards required from Cambridge International Examinations.  As a result, Orchlon School became the only school in Mongolia to offer National and International qualifications in all levels including primary, middle, high school and upper school levels. 
	
The Cambridge International Secondary Education qualifications available at Orchlon School are as follows:

Grades 1 to 5		Cambridge International Primary Programme;  
Grades 6 to 8		Cambridge Checkpoint Middle school  Lower secondary programme;  
Grades 9 to 10		International General Certificate of Secondary Education;   
Grades 11 to 12		Cambridge AS and A levels.

External links 

 Official website

Schools in Mongolia
Cambridge schools in Mongolia